Acacia gonophylla, also known as rasp-stemmed wattle, is a shrub belonging to the genus Acacia and the subgenus Phyllodineae that is endemic to south western parts of Australia.

Description
It has ribbed glabrous branchlets with caducous stipules caducous. The ascending to erect green phyllodes are often shallowly incurved and have five prominently raised nerves. It produces cream-yellow flowers from May to October.

Taxonomy
The species was first formally described by the botanist George Bentham in 1855 as part of the work Plantae Muellerianae: Mimoseae as published in Linnaea: ein Journal für die Botanik in ihrem ganzen Umfange, oder Beiträge zur Pflanzenkunde. It was reclassified as Racosperma gonophyllum in 2003 by Leslie Pedley then transferred back to the genus Acacia in 2006.

Distribution
It is native to an area along the south coast in the Goldfields-Esperance and Great Southern regions of Western Australia from around the Stirling Ranges in the north to Albany in the west to around Israelite Bay in the east where it is found on plains, flats and sand dunes growing in gravelly sandy lateritic or quartzitic soils usually as a part of heath, mallee or open Eucalyptus woodland communities.

See also
List of Acacia species

References

gonophylla
Acacias of Western Australia
Plants described in 1855
Taxa named by George Bentham